Hygrophorus camarophyllus is a species of edible fungus in the genus Hygrophorus.

References

External links
 

camarophyllus
Fungi of Europe
Edible fungi
Taxa named by Johannes Baptista von Albertini
Taxa named by Lewis David de Schweinitz